Jonatan Jezus Isenia (born March 31, 1993) is a Curaçaon former professional baseball player. A pitcher, Isenia played in Minor League Baseball in the Baltimore Orioles organization.

Isenia competed for the Netherlands national baseball team in the 2013 World Baseball Classic.

References

External links

1993 births
2013 World Baseball Classic players
Baseball pitchers
Curaçao baseball players
Curaçao expatriate baseball players in the United States
Dominican Summer League Orioles players
Curaçao expatriate baseball players in the Dominican Republic
Gulf Coast Orioles players
Living people
People from Willemstad